Naby Laye Keïta (born 16 April 1994) is a Guinean professional footballer who plays as forward for Ghana Premier League side Asante Kotoko S.C.

Club career

Early career 
Keïta played for  FC Renaissance Club De Conakry in his home country Guinea before moving to Ghana to play for Kumasi Asante Kotoko.

Asante Kotoko 
In October 2018, Keïta moved to Ghana and signed a three-year contract with KumasI Asante Kotoko on a free transfer. He was the first signing of then newly appointed coach, C. K. Akonnor. On 24 April 2019, he made his debut during the 2019 GFA Normalization Committee Special Competition, coming on in the 75th minute for Obed Owusu in a 2–0 win over Berekum Chelsea. On 26 January 2020, he played the full 90 minutes and scored a late penalty in the 90th minute to help Kotoko to victory over rivals Accra Hearts of Oak. He went on to make 5 league matches as Kotoko were crowned winners of the competition. On 10 March 2021, he came on in the 76th minute for Patrick Kojo Asmah to scored the only goal in a 1–0 win over King Faisal Babes and push them to 4th place on the league table.

References

External links
 
 
 

Living people
1994 births
Guinean footballers
Asante Kotoko S.C. players
Ghana Premier League players
Association football forwards